Gerolamo Vitale de Buoi (died 1596) was a Roman Catholic prelate who served as Bishop of Camerino (1580–1596).

On 4 May 1580, Gerolamo Vitale de Buoi was appointed during the papacy of Pope Gregory XIII as Bishop of Camerino.
He served as Bishop of Camerino until his death on 26 January 1596.

References

External links and additional sources
 (for Chronology of Bishops) 
 (for Chronology of Bishops) 

16th-century Italian Roman Catholic bishops
Bishops appointed by Pope Gregory XIII
1508 deaths